Langley with Hardley is a parish in the county of Norfolk, England, about a mile east of Loddon.

The church of Hardley, St Margaret, is one of 124 existing round-tower churches in Norfolk.

Langley Abbey in the parish is now a museum which can be visited.

Langely Dike and Hardley Dike on the River Yare are both part of the Norfolk Broads waterways, however offering only private moorings.

Notes

External links
Hardley St Margaret's on the European Round Tower Churches Website

Civil parishes in Norfolk